Coal City High School is a four-year high school in north-central Illinois. At last count, the school had 650 students, and is a member of the Illinois High School Association and the Illinois Central Eight Conference.

Coal City High School has an "A+ Rating" from the home-facts rating service.

Notable alumni

Greg Washburn, Former MLB player (California Angels)

References

External links
 Coal City Community Unit School District #1

educational institutions in the United States with year of establishment missing
high schools in Illinois
schools in Grundy County, Illinois